"Anything at All" is a song written by David Thomson and Heather Morgan, and recorded by Canadian country music duo Autumn Hill for their debut studio album, Favourite Mistake (2013). It was released through Wax Records as the lead single from the album on October 30, 2012.

Content
The song is a plea to a former lover, wondering if there's "anything at all" left of what they once had, and if there's any chance they might rekindle their romance.

Music video
An official music video for the song was directed by Margaret Malandruccolo and debuted on November 15, 2012.

Chart performance
"Anything At All" debuted at #96 on the Canadian Hot 100 for the week ending January 26, 2013.

References

2012 singles
Autumn Hill songs
Country ballads
2012 songs
Music videos directed by Margaret Malandruccolo
Songs written by Heather Morgan (songwriter)